"I Have to Surrender" is a song written by Pat Bunch and Doug Johnson, and recorded by American country music artist Ty Herndon.  It was released in September 1997 as the fourth single from the album Living in a Moment. The song reached number 17 on the Billboard Hot Country Singles & Tracks chart.

Chart performance

References

1997 singles
1996 songs
Ty Herndon songs
Songs written by Pat Bunch
Songs written by Doug Johnson (record producer)
Epic Records singles
Song recordings produced by Doug Johnson (record producer)